The listing shows recordings of the Mass in B minor, BWV 232, by Johann Sebastian Bach. The selection is taken from the 281 recordings listed on the Bach Cantatas Website , beginning with the first recording by a symphony orchestra and choir to match, conducted by Albert Coates. Beginning in the late 1960s, historically informed performances paved the way for recordings with smaller groups, boys choirs and ensembles playing period instruments, and eventually to recordings using the one-voice-on-a-vocal-part scoring first argued for by Joshua Rifkin in 1982.

History 
The work was first recorded by symphonic choirs and orchestras. From the late 1960s, historically informed performances (HIP) tried to adhere more to the sounds of the composer's lifetime, who typically wrote for boys choirs and for comparatively small orchestras of Baroque instruments, often now called "period instruments". Some scholars believe that Bach used only one singer for a vocal part in the choral movements, termed "one voice per part" (OVPP). On some of these recordings, the solo singer is reinforced in choral movements with a larger orchestra by a ripieno singer (OVPP+R).

The first complete recording of the work was conducted by Albert Coates in 1929. Robert Shaw led the first American recording in 1947. Some recordings are documents of live concerts, such as a 1968 performance conducted by Karl Richter at the Moscow Conservatory Grand Hall. The same year, the first HIP recording appeared, conducted by Nikolaus Harnoncourt, followed by Johan van der Meer's version with the Groningse Bachvereniging in 1975 which was recorded live in Utrecht at the Holland Festival. The first OVPP recording appeared in 1982, conducted by Joshua Rifkin.

Table of selected recordings 

The sortable listing is taken from the selection provided by Aryeh Oron on the Bach-Cantatas website.

Soloists
Bach composed the work for five soloists: soprano I and II, alto, tenor and bass. The soloists are listed in the table in the order SATB.

Some recordings arranged the music for four soloists, the movements in which soprano II (SII) is requested, are divided, sung by soprano I (SI) and alto (A).
 Christe eleison: A for SII in the duet with SI
 Laudamus te: SI or A in the aria for SII

Some recordings divide the two bass solos on two singers because of their very different tessitura:
 Quoniam tu solus sanctus: the aria requires a bass with a strong low register
 Et in spiritum sanctum: the aria requires a bass with a high range which would today be termed a baritone

The composition has a movement for two choirs SATB, Osanna. In recordings with one voice per part (OVPP), the soloists are normally listed in the order SSAATTBB. For some recordings, only the singers doing solo work are named.

Choir type

 Large choirs (red background): Large (unspecified), Bach (choir dedicated to Bach's music, founded in the mid-20th century, Boys (choir of all male voices), Radio (choir of a broadcaster), Symphony (choir related to a symphony orchestra)
 Medium-size choirs, such as Chamber, Chorale (choir dedicated mostly to church music), Motet
 One voice per part (green background): OVPP or OVPP+R (with ripienists reinforcing the soloists in some chorale movements)

Orchestra type
 Large orchestras (red background): Bach (orchestra dedicated to Bach's music, founded in the mid-20th century), Radio (symphony orchestra of a broadcaster), Symphony
 Chamber orchestra
 Orchestra on period instruments (green background)

Table

Notes

References

External links
Mass in B minor Commentary, musical examples, list of recordings, and other information, on bach-cantatas

Discographies of compositions by J. S. Bach
Masses by Johann Sebastian Bach